(Skolt Sami: Vue'rjemjokk    and ) is a small village in Sør-Varanger Municipality in Troms og Finnmark county, Norway. It is located on the shore of the Barents Sea at the mouth of the Jakobselva river. The area was settled by Norwegians in 1851.

Border with Russia

The Jakobselva river forms the border with Russia, on the east side of Grense Jakobselv.  Here, there is a small post of the Garrison of Sør-Varanger of the Norwegian Army, from where soldiers patrol the border.  In this area, however, there is no public border crossing.

King Oscar II Chapel
In the village, there is a stone chapel built in 1869 called King Oscar II Chapel.  The church was built to reinforce Norway's territorial claim to the area, and was named after King Oscar II of Sweden and Norway at a visit he made in 1873.

Distance from Oslo
Grense Jakobselv is the point in mainland Norway farthest by national road from Norway's capital Oslo. In this scenario, Gamvik would be the farthest place from Oslo.

References

External links 

Tourist information website
Conduct and Travel at the Norwegian - Russian Border - Norges Grensekommissær (from archive.org)

Villages in Finnmark
Barents Sea
Sør-Varanger
Populated places of Arctic Norway